Walter Wharton "Ward" McIntyre, Jr (1930 – July 20, 2007) was a television and radio personality from Birmingham, Alabama. A graduate of Ramsay High School and Birmingham-Southern College, he worked at WSGN radio before he was hired by WBRC in 1962 to take over as announcer, newscaster, and Bozo the Clown. He remained at the station until 1968, when he returned to radio, where he remained until his retirement from WBHM in the 1990s.

References
 Walton, Val (July 22, 2007) "Walter McIntyre, city's `Bozo,' dies." Birmingham News.
 Ward McIntyre article at BhamWiki.com

External links

1930 births
2007 deaths
Television anchors from Birmingham, Alabama
Ramsay High School alumni